Anamika may refer to:

People
 Anamika (poet) (born 1961), Indian poet and novelist
 Anamika Khanna (born 1977), fashion designer based in Kolkata, India
 Anamika Saha, Indian actress
 Anamika Choudhari, Indian singer

Television and film
 Anamika (1973 film), a 1973 Hindi film
 Anamika (2008 film), a Bollywood film
 Anaamika, a 2014 Telugu and Tamil film
 Anamika (2012 TV series), a television series on Sony Entertainment Television India and Sony Entertainment Television Asia
 Anamika (2022 TV series)
Anamika (album), a 1992 Assamese music album by :Zubeen Garg

Other uses
 Anamika (fungus), a genus of fungus in the family Cortinariaceae
 Anamika (newsletter), a newsletter for South Asian lesbians and queer women